The Second Volleyball World Grand Champions Cup women's volleyball was held in Japan at 14 to 23 November 1997.

Teams

Squads

Competition formula
The competition formula of the 1997 Women's World Grand Champions Cup is the single Round-Robin system. Each team plays once against each of the 5 remaining teams. Points are accumulated during the whole tournament, and the final standing is determined by the total points gained.

Venues
Osaka-jō Hall (Osaka)
Hiroshima Green Arena (Hiroshima)
Yoyogi National Gymnasium (Tokyo)

Results

|}

Osaka round

|}

Hiroshima round

|}

Tokyo round

|}

Final standing

Team Roster
Yelena Vasilevskaya, Natalya Morozova, Yelena Batukhtina, Yelena Godina, Yevgeniya Artamonova, Olga Chukanova, Tatyana Gracheva, Elizaveta Tishchenko, Anastasiya Belikova, Natalya Safronova, Anna Artamonova, Irina Tebenikhina
Head Coach: Nikolay Karpol

Awards
MVP:  Yevgeniya Artamonova
Best Scorer:  Yevgeniya Artamonova
Best Spiker:  Regla Bell
Best Blocker:  Anastasiya Belikova
Best Server:  Natalya Morozova
Best Digger:  Hiroko Tsukumo
Best Setter:  Taismary Agüero
Best Receiver:  Yelena Batukhtina

External links
Competition results
Official Website
Best Players

FIVB Volleyball Women's World Grand Champions Cup
World Grand Champions Cup
FIVB Women's World Grand Champions cup
V

ja:1997年ワールドグランドチャンピオンズカップ